The 2015 NCAA Division II men's basketball tournament involved 64 teams playing in a single-elimination tournament to determine the national champion of men's NCAA Division II college basketball. It began on March 13, 2015, following the 2014–15 season and concluded with the championship game on March 28, 2015.

The eight regional winners met in the Elite Eight for the quarterfinal, semifinal, and championship rounds. For the second straight year, the final rounds were  held at the Ford Center in Evansville, Indiana.

Florida Southern defeated Indiana (PA), 77–62, to win their second national championship and first title since the 1981 NCAA Division II tournament.

Qualification
The champions of 22 of the 24 Division II basketball conferences qualified automatically. An additional 42 teams were selected as “at-large” participants by the selection committee. The first three rounds of the tournament were organized in regions comprising eight participants in groups of two or three conferences (two in the Atlantic and Midwest regions). The regionals were hosted at the home court of the top seeded team.

Automatic qualifiers
The following teams automatically qualified for the national tournament as the champions of their conference tournaments.

At-large qualifiers

Regionals

Southeast - Harrogate, Tennessee
Location: Tex Turner Arena Host: Lincoln Memorial University

South Central - Stephenville, Texas
Location: Wisdom Gym Host: Tarleton State University

West - Azusa, California
Location: Felix Event Center Host: Azusa Pacific University

Atlantic - West Liberty, West Virginia
Location: Academic, Sports and Recreation Complex (ASRC) Host: West Liberty University

East - Springfield, Massachusetts
Location: Botuva Gymnasium Host: American International College

South - Lakeland, Florida
Location: Jenkins Field House Host: Florida Southern College

Midwest - Louisville, Kentucky
Location: Knights Hall Host: Bellarmine University

Central - Sioux Falls, South Dakota
Location: Sanford Pentagon Host: Augustana College

Elite Eight - Evansville, Indiana
Location: Ford Center Host: University of Southern Indiana

All-tournament team
 Kevin Capers (Florida Southern)
 Devante Chance (Indiana (PA))
 Shawn Dyer (Indiana (PA))
 Jacobo Diaz (Indiana (PA))
 Dylan Travis (Florida Southern)

References
 2015 NCAA Division II men's basketball tournament jonfmorse.com

NCAA Division II men's basketball tournament
Ncaa tournament
NCAA Division II Men's Basketball
NCAA Division II basketball tournament